Dolní Věstonice (often without diacritics as Dolni Vestonice) is an Upper Paleolithic archaeological site near the village of Dolní Věstonice in the South Moravian Region of the Czech Republic, at the base of Mount Děvín, . It dates to approximately 26,000 BP, as supported by radiocarbon dating. The site is unique in that it has been a particularly abundant source of prehistoric artifacts (especially art) dating from the Gravettian period, which spanned roughly from 27,000 to 20,000 BC. In addition to the abundance of art, this site also includes carved representations of men, women, and animals, along with personal ornaments, human burials and enigmatic engravings.

Introduction
Soon after excavations of this site began in 1924, the significance of Dolní Věstonice became apparent. Thousands of ceramic artifacts, many of which depicted animals, were found associated with the site. The animals molded in the clay include lions, rhinoceroses, and mammoths. These figurines have been interpreted to have been of some ceremonial significance to the ancient occupants of the site. In addition to these artifacts, two figurines depicting women were found. One of the figurines, known as the Black Venus, was found on a hillside amongst charred mammoth bones; the other depicted a woman with a deformed face. Speculation regarding the relation of the second Venus figurine with a woman buried at the site, who had a deformation on the same side of the face, may imply a connection between the two. This woman’s skeleton was found buried under the scapula of a mammoth, with a fox pelt and red ochre. Such a burial is attributed to the relative importance of this individual to the people who occupied this site.
Contrary to popular beliefs regarding the hunting practices of people living in the Upper Pleistocene, the inhabitants of this site did not solely chase mammoths with spears. Indentations of netting on the clay floors of the huts found at the site were preserved in the archaeological record when the structures burned down, hardening the clay. These indentations strongly suggest that these people were using nets to catch smaller prey in addition to hunting mammoths with spears. Finally, shells found at the site have been shown to originate from the Mediterranean, suggesting these people either traveled to collect them or were trade partners with other groups nearby.

History

Organization of living space
Dolní Věstonice is an open-air site located along a stream. Its people hunted mammoths and other herd animals, saving mammoth and other bones that could be used to construct a fence-like boundary, separating the living space into a distinct inside and outside. In this way, the perimeter of the site would be easily distinguishable. At the center of the enclosure was a large bonfire and huts were grouped together within the barrier of the bone fence.

Tally stick
The so-called Wolf bone is a prehistoric artifact discovered in 1937 during excavations led by Karel Absolon. Dated to the Aurignacian, approximately 30,000 years ago, the bone is marked with 55 marks which some believe to be tally marks. The head of an ivory Venus figurine was excavated close to the bone.

Dugout
At an isolated site 80 meters upstream lies a lean-to shelter dug into an embankment. An estimated 2,300 clay figurines of various animals were found in and around the remains of a kiln. It may be one of the first instances of a covered oven, hot enough to fire clay. Most of the figurines were broken and found in fragments. General consensus agrees that they were likely intentionally and perhaps ritualistically broken, but offers no conclusive reason. One hypothesis posits that these figurines had magical significance, and were intentionally fashioned from wet clay so that they would explode when fired.

Female figurines

The Dolní Věstonice artifacts also include some of the earliest examples of fired clay sculptures, including the Venus of Dolní Věstonice, and date back to 26,000 BP.
The female figurine is a ceramic statuette depiction of a wide-hipped, nude female. This figurine is similar to other figurines found throughout the area at nearby archaeological sites such as Willendorf and the Caves of Grimaldi (see Grimaldi Man). In 2004, a tomograph scan of the figurine showed a fingerprint of a child who must have handled it before it was fired. A majority of the clay figurines at Dolní Věstonice were found around either the dugout or the central fire pit located within the site.

Carved ivory figure of young man
Particularly striking is a sculpture which may represent the first example of portraiture (i.e., representation of a specific person). The majority of anthropomorphic figures on this site bear no distinct facial features, but this figure, carved in mammoth ivory, is roughly three inches high. The subject appears to be a young man with heavy bone structure, thick, long hair reaching past his shoulders, and possibly traces of a beard. Originally found in 1891, there was concern that the finding might be a hoax. Particle spectrometry analysis conducted at the University of Kansas Space Technology Center placed the date of the carved surface of the ivory at around 26,000 BP, but this does not prove the head is genuine as fossilized ivory is abundant in the area.

Carved ivory figure of elder
 
A carved ivory figure in the shape of a female head was discovered near the huts. The left side of the figure’s face was distorted.

Description of elder's burial
One of the burials, located near the huts, revealed a human female skeleton aged to 40+ years old, ritualistically placed beneath a pair of mammoth scapulae, one leaning against the other. Surprisingly, the left side of the skull was disfigured in the same manner as the aforementioned carved ivory figure, indicating that the figure was an intentional depiction of this specific individual. The bones and the earth surrounding the body contained traces of red ocher, a flint spearhead had been placed near the skull, and one hand held the body of a fox. This evidence suggests that this was the burial site of a shaman. This is the oldest site not only of ceramic figurines and artistic portraiture, but also of evidence of female shamans.

Burial of three individuals
During an excavation at the site in 1986, a well-preserved triple burial was unearthed. The site is dated to be 28 kya. The remains of three male individuals were found. It was initially believed that the middle of the three bodies was a female, but recent DNA evidence has proved the body was a male. The bodies were lying in an extended lengthwise position, covered by burnt spruce logs and branches. The body in the middle was placed first, being partially covered by the other two. The other two were in different positions. One was faced down and the other on his side with hands reaching the pubic region of the middle body. The heads of all three were covered with red ochre, the central body also having red ochre around his pubis. All three individuals are theorized to be related based on three rare traits: unilateral absence of the frontal sinus, specific auditory exostoses, and impaction of the upper wisdom teeth. Each individual is believed to be about 16–25 years old at the time of death. The central body suffers from a genetic pathology resulting in the curved form of his legs. Red ochre, a pigment commonly used for rituals, was found over the pelvis.

Textiles
Imprints of textiles pressed into clay were found at the site. Evidence from several sites in the Czech Republic indicate that the weavers of Upper Palaeolithic were using a variety of techniques that enabled them to produce plaited basketry, nets, and sophisticated twined and plain woven cloth.

Interpretation
A burial of an approximately forty-year-old woman was found at Dolní Věstonice in an elaborate burial setting. Various items found with the woman have had a profound impact on the interpretation of the social hierarchy of the people at the site, as well as indicating an increased lifespan for these inhabitants. The remains were covered in red ochre, a compound known to have religious significance, indicating that this woman’s burial was ceremonial in nature. Also, the inclusion of a mammoth scapula and a fox are indicative of a high-status burial.

In the Upper Paleolithic, anatomically modern humans began living longer, often reaching middle age, by today’s standards. Rachel Caspari argues in "Human Origins: the Evolution of Grandparents," that life expectancy increased during the Upper Paleolithic in Europe (Caspari 2011). She also describes why elderly people were highly influential in society. Grandparents assisted in childcare, perpetuated cultural transmission, and contributed to the increased complexity of stone tools (Caspari 2011). The woman found at Dolní Věstonice was old enough to have been a grandparent. Although human lifespans were increasing, elderly individuals in Upper Paleolithic societies were still relatively rare. Because of this, it is possible that the woman was attributed with great importance and wisdom, and revered because of her age. Because of her advanced age, it is also possible she had a decreased ability to care for herself, instead relying on her family group to care for her, which indicates strong social connections.

Furthermore, a female figurine was found at the site and is believed to be associated with the aged woman, because of remarkably similar facial characteristics. The woman was found to have deformities on the left side of her face. The special importance accorded with her burial, in addition to her facial deformity, makes it possible that she was a shaman in this time period, where it was “not uncommon that people with disabilities, either mental or physical, are thought to have unusual supernatural powers” (Pringle 2010).

In 1981, Patricia Rice studied a multitude of female clay figurines found at Dolní Věstonice, believed to represent fertility in this society. She challenged this assumption by analyzing all the figurines and found that, "it is womanhood, rather than motherhood that is symbolically recognized or honored" (Rice 1981: 402). This interpretation challenged the widely held assumption that all prehistoric female figurines were created to honor fertility. The fact is that we have no idea why these figurines proliferated nor of their purpose or usage.

Genetics
Three inhabitants of Dolní Věstonice, lived 31,155 years ago (calibrated date) and to have mitochondrial haplogroup U, and one inhabitant mitochondrial haplogroup U8.

In the Vestonice 13 sample, the Y chromosomal haplogroup CT (not IJK-L16) (CTS109+, CTS5318+, CTS6327+, CTS8243+, CTS9556+, Z17718+, Y1571+, M5831+) was determined, for the Vestonice 15 sample, the Y chromosome haplogroup BT (PF1178+), in the Vestonice 43 sample, the Y chromosome haplogroup F (not I) (P145+, P158+). In the Vestonice 16 sample, the Y chromosomal haplogroup C1a2 (V20+, V86+).

References

Dolni Vestonice I - the Kiln and Encampment. Don's Maps- Paleolithic European, Russian and Australian Archaeology. Ed. Don Hitchcock.
Formicola, V., Pontrandolif, A., and Svoboda, J. 2001: The Upper Paleolithic Triple Burial of Dolni Vestonice: Pathology and Funerary Behavior. American Journal of Physical Anthropology 115:372-374.

Further reading
Jelínek, J., Pictorial Encyclopedia of the Evolution of Man, Prague: Hamlyn (1975).
National Geographic Magazine, The National Geographic Society, October 1988.
Price, T. D., and G. M. Feinman. Images of the past. New York: McGraw-Hill Higher Education, 2010. Print.
Pringle, Heather. "Ice Age Communities May Be Earliest Known Net Hunters." Science Magazine 277.5300 (1997): 1203-204. Science. Web. Trinkaus, Erik, Svoboda, Jiří. Early Modern Human Evolution in Central Europe: the People of Dolní Věstonice and Pavlov. Oxford: Oxford UP, 2006. Google Books. Web.
Shreeve, James, The Neandertal Enigma: Solving the Mystery of Modern Human Origins, New York: William Morrow and Company (1995).
Tedlock, Barbara, "The Woman in the Shaman's Body; Reclaiming the feminine in religion and medicine", New York: Bantam Dell, 2005.
The Origins of Ceramic Technology at Dolni Věstonice, Czechoslovakia. Vandiver, Pamela B, Klima, Bohuslav, Svoboda, Jiři, Soffer, Olga. Science. Vol. 246 Issue 4933.

Archaeological sites in the Czech Republic
Upper Paleolithic sites in Europe
Prehistory of the Czech lands
Prehistoric sites in the Czech Republic
South Moravian Region
Former populated places in the Czech Republic